Macdonaldite is a rare barium silicate mineral with a chemical formula of BaCa4Si16O36(OH)2·10H2O. Macdonaldite was first described in 1965 and named for Gordon A. Macdonald (1911–1978) an American volcanologist at the University of Hawaii. 

Macdonaldite crystallises in the orthorhombic system. Macdonaldite is anisotropic with low relief. 

Macdonaldite appears as veins and fracture coatings in a sanbornite and quartz bearing metamorphic rock. Macdonaldite was first described in 1965 for an occurrence near the Big Creek-Rush Creek area in Fresno County, California. It has also been reported from Mariposa and Tulare counties in California. It has also been reported from a quarry in San Venanzo, Umbria, Italy.

References

Barium minerals
Calcium minerals
Phyllosilicates
Orthorhombic minerals
Minerals in space group 63